Tagir Radzhabovich Ulanbekov (born July 8, 1991) is a Russian mixed martial artist who competes in the Flyweight division of the Ultimate Fighting Championship (UFC). He is also the former Fight Nights Global Flyweight Champion. He is one-time World champion, one-time Eurasian champion and one-time European cup winner in combat sambo, for his team SC Bazarganova. As of January 24, 2023, he is #14 in the UFC flyweight rankings.

Background 
Tagir Ulanbekov was born to an Avar family on July 8, 1991, in the Kazbekovsky District of the Republic of Dagestan. 

As a child, Ulanbekov began wrestling after his uncle took him to a wrestling section named after Saypulla Absaidov. When Ulanbekov was 8 years old, he moved to Makhachkala, Dagestan. In Makhachkala, he joined the ranks of Eagles MMA and was coached by Abdulmanap Nurmagomedov. There, he trained alongside fighters such as Khabib Nurmagomedov and Islam Makhachev.

Growing up, Tagir worked in the bazaar, helping his mother.

Mixed martial arts career

Early career
Ulanbekov won his first career victory over Magomednur Aglarov at the "Liga Kavkaz - Grand Umakhan Battle" tournament. He would go on to win 7 bouts in a row, and won the Fight Night Global Flyweight title, where he submitted Artan Asatryan in the fourth round via guillotine choke at Fight Nights Global 76. Ulanbekov would face defeat for the first time in his career against fellow future UFC fighter Zhalgas Zhumagulov at Fight Nights Global 88, losing the close bout by majority decision. He would then compete under the banner of Gorilla Fighting Championship (Now Eagle FC), where he went 3-0 and captured the GF Flyweight Championship.

Ultimate Fighting Championship

Ulanbekov was scheduled to face Bruno Gustavo da Silva on September 12, 2020, at UFC Fight Night: Waterson vs. Hill. However, due to travel restrictions related to the COVID-19 pandemic, the pairing was rescheduled and took place four weeks later at UFC Fight Night: Moraes vs. Sandhagen. Ulanbekov won the fight via unanimous decision.

Ulanbekov was scheduled to face Matheus Nicolau on January 24, 2021 at UFC 257. However, Ulanbekov withdrew due to undisclosed reasons. The pairing was eventually rescheduled for UFC Fight Night 187. However, Ulanbekov withdrew from the bout the second time for undisclosed reasons and was replaced by Manel Kape.

Ulanbekov was scheduled to face Tyson Nam on June 19, 2021, at UFC on ESPN 25. However, the bout was never officially announced by the promotion and the matchup did not take place on the card due to an undisclosed illness for Ulanbekov.

Ulanbekov faced Allan Nascimento on October 30, 2021, at UFC 267. He won the fight via split decision.

Ulanbekov faced Tim Elliott on March 5, 2022, at UFC 272. He lost the fight via unanimous decision. 12 out of 17 media scores gave it to Ulanbekov.

Ulanbekov was scheduled to face Tyson Nam on June 25, 2022, at UFC on ESPN 38 but pulled out due to undisclosed injury.

Ulanbekov faced Nate Maness on November 5, 2022 at UFC Fight Night 214. He won the fight via a guillotine choke submission in the first round.

Championships and accomplishments

Mixed martial arts
Fight Night Global
 Fight Night Global Flyweight Championship (One time)
Gorilla Fighting Championship (Now Eagle FC)
GF Flyweight Championship (One time)
Two successful title defences

Sambo
European Combat Sambo Federation (ECSF)
European Combat Sambo Championship-Kishinev, Moldova (2012) at 57kg
European Cup in Combat Sambo among Clubs-Yalta, Crimea (2012) at 57kg representing SC Bazarganova
Combat Sambo Eurasia Championship-Yalta, Crimea (2014) at 57kg
World Combat Sambo Federation (WCSF)
World Combat Sambo Championship-Moscow, Russia (2014) at 57kg

Mixed martial arts record

|-
|Win
|align=center|14–2
|Nate Maness
|Submission (guillotine choke)
|UFC Fight Night: Rodriguez vs. Lemos
|
|align=center|1
|align=center|2:11
|Las Vegas, Nevada, United States
|
|-
|Loss
|align=center|13–2
|Tim Elliott
|Decision (unanimous)
|UFC 272
|
|align=center|3
|align=center|5:00
|Las Vegas, Nevada, United States
|
|-
|Win
|align=center|13–1
|Allan Nascimento
|Decision (split)
|UFC 267
|
|align=center|3
|align=center|5:00
|Abu Dhabi, United Arab Emirates
|
|-
|Win
|align=center|12–1
|Bruno Gustavo da Silva
| Decision (unanimous)
|UFC Fight Night: Moraes vs. Sandhagen
|
|align=center|3
|align=center|5:00
|Abu Dhabi, United Arab Emirates
|
|-
|Win
|align=center|11–1
|Denilson Matos
|Submission (guillotine choke)
|Gorilla Fighting 22
|
|align=center|2
|align=center|1:18
|Krasnodar, Russia
|
|-
|Win
|align=center|10–1
|Denis Araujo
|Submission (rear-naked choke)
|Gorilla Fighting 17
|
|align=center|2
|align=center|3:19
|Atyrau, Kazakhstan
|
|-
|Win
|align=center|9–1
|Aleksandr Podlesniy
|Decision (unanimous)
|Gorilla Fighting 11
|
|align=center|3
|align=center|5:00
|Penza, Russia
|
|-
|Loss
|align=center|8–1
|Zhalgas Zhumagulov
|Decision (majority)
|Fight Nights Global 88 
|
|align=center|3
|align=center|5:00
|Astana, Kazakhstan
|
|-
| Win
| align=center|8–0
| Vartan Asatryan
| Submission (guillotine choke)
|Fight Nights Global 76
|
|align=center|4
|align=center|1:39
|Krasnodar, Russia
|
|-
| Win
| align=center| 7–0
| Shajidul Haque
| Decision (unanimous)
|Fight Nights Global 65
|
|align=center|3
|align=center|5:00
|Astana, Kazakhstan
| 
|-
|Win
|align=center| 6–0
|Assu Almabaev
|TKO (submission to punches)
|Fight Nights Global 58
|
|align=center|3
|align=center| 4:51
|Kaspiysk, Russia
| 
|-
|Win
|align=center| 5–0
|Shyngys Kairanov
|Decision (unanimous)
|Fight Nights Global 54
|
|align=center|3
|align=center|5:00
|Rostov-on-Don, Russia
| 
|-
|Win
|align=center| 4–0
|Alexander Nesterov
|Submission (rear-naked choke)
|Pride Fighting Show: The Stars of World MMA
|
|align=center|1
|align=center|2:18
|Nizhny Novgorod, Russia
| 
|-
|Win
|align=center| 3–0
|Ivan Andrushchenko
|Decision (majority)
|Fight Star: Battle on the Volga
|
|align=center| 2
|align=center| 5:00
|Saratov, Russia
| 
|-
|Win
|align=center| 2–0
|Nurtilek Yerkuatuly
|Submission (armbar)
|Liga Kavkaz: Battle in Babayurt
|
|align=center| 1
|align=center| 2:48
|Dagestan, Russia
|
|-
|Win
|align=center| 1–0
|Magomednur Aglarov
|Submission (armbar)
|Liga Kavkaz: Grand Umakhan Battle
|
|align=center| 1
|align=center| 4:50
|Khunzakh, Russia
|

See also 
 List of current UFC fighters
 List of male mixed martial artists

References

External links 
  
 

1991 births
Living people
People from Kazbekovsky District
Dagestani mixed martial artists
Russian male mixed martial artists
Flyweight mixed martial artists
Mixed martial artists utilizing sambo
Ultimate Fighting Championship male fighters
Russian sambo practitioners